The men's long jump event  at the 1995 IAAF World Indoor Championships was held on 10–11 March.

Medalists

Results

Qualification
Qualification: 7.85 (Q) or at least 12 best performers (q) qualified for the final.

Final

References

Long
Long jump at the World Athletics Indoor Championships